The 2017 SMP Russian Circuit Racing Series was the fourth season of the Russian Circuit Racing Series, organized by SMP Racing. It was the third season with TCR class cars, competing alongside the Super 2000 TC2 cars.

Dmitry Bragin became TCR Russia champion for a second year in a row, Mikhail Mityaev won Russian Cup in Super-Production category. Denis Bulatov became Champion of Russia in Touring-Light, and Aidar Nuriev won Russian Cup in National category. Maxim Kornilkov become the winner of National-Junior category. Irek Minnakhmetov became first ever SMP RCRS Trophy winner.

Teams and drivers
All teams and drivers were Russian-registered except Vladislav Seredenko from Ukraine who performs in the National Junior class. Yokohama was the official tyre supplier.

Touring / TCR Russian Touring Car Championship

In the Trophy class, pilots who are not prize-winners of foreign racing series and who are not prize-winners of the Russian Championship participate.

Super Production

Touring Light

National

National Junior

Calendar and results
The 2017 schedule was announced on 12 December 2016, with all events scheduled to be held in Russia.

Championship standings

Scoring systems

Touring / TCR Russian Touring Car Championship

† – Drivers did not finish the race, but were classified as they completed over 75% of the race distance.

Touring / TCR Russian Touring Car Championship Team's Standing

Super Production

Super Production Team's Standing

Touring-Light

Touring-Light Team's Standing

National

Touring-Light Team's Standing

National-Junior

References

External links
 

Russian Circuit Racing Series
Russian Circuit Racing Series
Russian Circuit Racing Series
Russian Circuit Racing Series